Christopher Ryan Clark (born September 14, 1983) is an American politician and former Mayor of Mountain View, California. He was first elected to the Mountain View City Council in 2012 at age 29, making him the youngest and first openly LGBT elected official in the city’s history. Clark was subsequently elected mayor in January 2014 as one of the youngest mayors in the United States.

Biography

Clark grew up on a farm in Rozetta, Illinois and later served as a Page for the US House of Representatives. He attended Stanford University and earned a B.A. in Political Science with a minor in Economics. While Vice Mayor, In 2013, Clark completed Harvard University's John F. Kennedy School of Government program for Senior Executives in State and Local Government as a David Bohnett LGBTQ Victory Institute Leadership Fellow.

Career

Clark ran unsuccessfully for city council in 2008 and subsequently served on the Human Relations and Environmental Planning Commissions before winning his 2012 election bid.  He was the highest non-incumbent vote-getter and elected vice mayor by the council soon after taking office in January 2013.

References

Mayors of places in California
1983 births
California city council members
Stanford University alumni
Harvard Kennedy School alumni
LGBT people from California
American LGBT city council members
Living people
Gay politicians
LGBT mayors of places in the United States
21st-century American LGBT people